Kistenli-Bogdanovo (Kiśtänle-Boğźan) is a rural locality (a selo) in Bazlyksky Selsoviet, Bizhbulyaksky District, Bashkortostan, Russia. The population was 483 as of 2010. There are 10 streets.

Geography 
Kistenli-Bogdanovo is located 17 km north of Bizhbulyak (the district's administrative centre) by road. Petrovka is the nearest rural locality.

References 

Rural localities in Bizhbulyaksky District